Ncell Cup is a football knockout tournament in Nepal. The Ncell Cup tournament, sponsored by telecommunications company Ncell, is participated by the clubs ranked under the ‘A’ division.
The current holders of the tournament are Manang Marshyangdi Club who beat Boys Union Club 1-0 after extra-time in the final played at Dasarath Rangasala Stadium.

Venue
The tournament is played at the Dasarath Rangasala Stadium before the start of the league season.

Past winners

Performance by clubs

See also
Ncell Women's National Football Championship
Ncell Football

References

External links

 
National association football cups
Football cup competitions in Nepal